Igor Igorevich Gubanov (born 4 February 1992) is a Russian football player.

Club career
He made his professional debut in the Russian Professional Football League for FC SKVO Rostov-on-Don on 22 August 2013 in a game against FC MITOS Novocherkassk.

References

External links

1992 births
Sportspeople from Rostov-on-Don
Living people
Russian footballers
Association football defenders
Russian expatriate footballers
FC SKA Rostov-on-Don players
FC Rostov players
FC Sibir Novosibirsk players
FC Torpedo Minsk players
FC Zenit-Izhevsk players
FC Chayka Peschanokopskoye players
FC Slutsk players
FC Kyzylzhar players
FC Aktobe players
Belarusian Premier League players
Kazakhstan Premier League players
Russian expatriate sportspeople in Belarus
Russian expatriate sportspeople in Kazakhstan
Expatriate footballers in Belarus
Expatriate footballers in Kazakhstan